Leucothecium is a genus of fungi within the Onygenaceae family.

References

External links
Leucothecium at Index Fungorum

Onygenales
Eurotiomycetes genera